Jules Horowitz (3 October 1921 – 3 August 1995) was a French physicist.
The Jules Horowitz Reactor is named after him.

1921 births
1995 deaths
École Polytechnique alumni
Commandeurs of the Légion d'honneur
French physicists